Events from the year 1670 in Denmark.

Incumbents 

 Monarch – Frederick III (until 9 February), Christian V

Rcents

Undated
 The Barony of Einsiedelsborg on Funen is established for Mourids Henriksen Podebusk.

Events 

 9 February – Christian V becomes King of Denmark and Norway

Births

Deaths 
 9 February – Frederick III of Denmark, king of Denmark and Norway (born 1609)

Full date unknown
 Christiane Sehested, daughter of Christian IV and Kirsten Munk (born 1626)

References 

 
Denmark
Years of the 17th century in Denmark